Skiing was an American magazine devoted to skiing that was in print publication from 1948 until 2017. It was one of the two largest circulation magazines for skiers.

Early years

Merrill Hastings launched Rocky Mountain Skiing in 1948, a news-oriented magazine that soon developed into a national publication. In 1950, it changed its name to the National Skiing Newspaper; it became National Skiing in 1954; and its name was changed to Skiing in 1956. The magazine competed aggressively with Ski magazine, which was run by Bill Eldred. In the early years, the magazine was not entirely objective in its reviews, favoring resorts and equipment makers who advertised in its pages. Circulation rose to almost 50,000 in the first ten years.

New York

In 1964, the Ziff Davis company of New York bought Skiing magazine and Skiing Trade News from Hastings, and moved operations to New York. The company's owner, Bill Ziff, raided Ski magazine for experienced staff. Luray, the first editor, wanted a slick magazine, but Ziff had decided it should be more serious, aimed at dedicated skiers, and he replaced Luray with Doug Pfeiffer, a ski school director from California. Pfeiffer was editor in chief of Skiing magazine and its sister publications Skiing Trade News, Skiing Area News and Skiing International Yearbook from 1965 to 1976. Under Ziff, in 1965, the magazine started to issue test reports on skis. To avoid upsetting advertisers, none of the reports were negative. Due to the timing of new model releases, the skis being tested and the conditions under which they were being tested did not typically match the skis and conditions that the readers would be experiencing. Pfeiffer was followed as editor by John Jerome and then Al Greenberg.

In 1985, Ziff Davis sold Skiing and other magazines to the broadcaster CBS, and in 1987 CBS sold the magazines to Peter Diamandis. Later that year, Skiing magazine was bought for $25 million by the Times Mirror company, which also owned the rival Ski magazine. Times Mirror was purchased by the Tribune Company of Chicago in 2000, and the following year Skiing, Ski and other magazines were sold to Time4 Media, a subsidiary of Time Inc. By this time, the traditional skiing magazines were facing fierce competition from ski-related websites. In 2006, it was announced that the magazines would be sold again, to the Bonnier Group.

Final years
In 2013, Skiing was purchased by Active Interest Media, a 50 magazine publisher based in Boulder, Colorado, who in the winter of 2017/2018 incorporated the assets of Skiing into its sister publication SKI magazine, ceasing its publication after nearly 70 years.

Notes

Sources

External links
Archived issues

1948 establishments in New York (state)
2010 disestablishments in New York (state)
Bonnier Group
Monthly magazines published in the United States
Online magazines published in the United States
Sports magazines published in the United States
Defunct magazines published in the United States
Magazines established in 1948
Magazines disestablished in 2010
Magazines published in Colorado
Magazines published in Michigan
Magazines published in New York (state)
Mass media in Boulder, Colorado
Online magazines with defunct print editions
Skiing mass media